Piccadilly Zero Hour 12 is a 1963 West German crime film directed by Rudolf Zehetgruber and starring Helmut Wildt.

Cast
 Helmut Wildt - Mike Hilton
 Hanns Lothar - Jack Bellamy
 Ann Smyrner - Ruth Morgan
 Klaus Kinski - Whitey
 Karl Lieffen - Lee Costello
 Pinkas Braun - Sir Cunningham
 Ilja Richter - Edgar
 Marlene Warrlich - Della
 Camilla Spira - Pamela
 Rudolf Fernau - Craddock
 Stanislav Ledinek - Sammy
 Albert Bessler
 Dieter Eppler - Slatterly

External links

1963 films
1963 crime films
German crime films
West German films
1960s German-language films
German black-and-white films
Films directed by Rudolf Zehetgruber
Films set in London
1960s German films